Ryan Pore (born September 23, 1983 in Mansfield, Ohio) is an American former professional soccer player and the current head men's soccer coach of he Kansas City Roos men's soccer team at the University of Missouri–Kansas City.

Career

Youth and College
Pore attended Madison Comprehensive High School in Mansfield, Ohio and holds the Ohio High School Athletic Association record for most goals scored in a season (62) and school record in basketball for career scoring. He then went on to play college soccer at the University of Tulsa, where in 2004 he was a finalist for the Hermann Trophy and was awarded Soccer America Player of the Year.

Professional
Pore went on to forgo his senior season at Tulsa and signed a Generation Adidas contract. He was drafted in the second round (16th overall) of the 2005 MLS SuperDraft by Kansas City Wizards, and spent the next four years with the MLS side, playing in 58 league games and tallying three goals.

After the 2008 season, he was out of contract and signed with Portland Timbers of the USL First Division on March 12, 2009. During his first year with Portland, Pore appeared in 23 league matches scoring 10 goals. During the 2010 season Pore appeared in 29 league matches for Portland and led the USSF D2 Pro League in scoring with 15 goals and won both the golden boot and MVP.

On October 19, 2010 Pore was named as one of the first four players to be signed by the Portland Timbers ahead of their expansion into Major League Soccer in 2011, along with Steve Cronin, Bright Dike and Eddie Johnson.

On July 22, 2011 Pore joined NASL club Montreal Impact on loan until the end of the season.

Following the 2011 season, the Timbers announced that they had declined a second year option on Pore's contract and he would not be brought back for the 2012 season. Pore entered the 2011 MLS Re-Entry Draft but was not selected, making him a free agent.

Pore retired after the 2011 season and then moved to Tulsa, Oklahoma with his family and went back to school at the University of Tulsa. While at the University of Tulsa, Pore was the men's soccer team associate head coach.

On January 14, 2020, Pore was named as the new head coach of the Kansas City Roos men's soccer team.

Personal
He is married to the former Ashley Glenn, with whom he went to high school at Madison Comprehensive High School. In 2007, they were married in Mansfield, Ohio at St. Johns United Church Of Christ.  Ryan and Ashley have two children, Luca and Stella.  In his spare time, Ryan enjoys watching Cleveland sports teams and playing golf.

He coached his TSC 2000 boys team to being 2014 Oklahoma State Cup Champions and Quarter-Finalists in the 2014 USYS Southern Regional Championships.

Honors

Portland Timbers
USL First Division Commissioner's Cup (1): 2009

Individual
USL First Division All-League First Team (1): 2009
USSF D-2 Pro League Goal Scoring Champion (1): 2010
USSF D-2 Pro League Most Valuable Player (1): 2010
USSF D-2 Pro League Best XI (1): 2010

References

External links
 Portland Timbers bio
 

1983 births
Living people
All-American men's college soccer players
American soccer players
Expatriate soccer players in Canada
Major League Soccer players
Montreal Impact (1992–2011) players
North American Soccer League players
Portland Timbers players
Portland Timbers (2001–2010) players
Soccer players from Ohio
Sporting Kansas City draft picks
Sporting Kansas City players
Sportspeople from Mansfield, Ohio
Tulsa Golden Hurricane men's soccer coaches
Tulsa Golden Hurricane men's soccer players
USL First Division players
USSF Division 2 Professional League players
Association football forwards
Association football midfielders
American soccer coaches
Kansas City Roos men's soccer coaches